

The main United States Post Office in Eugene, Oregon, is a 2-story Art Deco building designed by Gilbert Stanley Underwood and constructed in 1939. The front facade features blue and cream colored terracotta with black and buff colored accents, and pilasters separate multicolored window bays. The building is the only example of federal Art Deco architecture in Lane County, and it is the only federal building in Oregon to use multicolored terracotta. Murals painted by Carl Morris were installed in the lobby in 1943. The post office was added to the National Register of Historic Places in 1985. The corner at 5th and Willamette Streets contains three sites listed on the register.

See also
 Lane Hotel, NRHP
 Eugene–Springfield station, NRHP

References

External links

 History of Downtown Eugene, University of Oregon blogs
 Historic Buildings of Downtown Eugene self guided walking tour

		
National Register of Historic Places in Eugene, Oregon
Art Deco architecture in Oregon
Buildings and structures completed in 1939